Justus Claproth (28 December 1728 – 20 February 1805) was a German jurist and inventor of the deinking process of recycled paper.

See also
German inventors and discoverers

1728 births
1805 deaths
18th-century German scientists
18th-century jurists
18th-century German inventors
German jurists